Bennettsville is an unincorporated community in Carr Township, Clark County, Indiana.

History
Bennettsville was laid out in 1838. It was likely named for Benedict Nugent, a local businessman. A post office was established at Bennettsville in 1847, and remained in operation until it was discontinued in 1924.

Geography

References

Unincorporated communities in Clark County, Indiana
Unincorporated communities in Indiana
Louisville metropolitan area
Populated places established in 1838
1838 establishments in Indiana